Bjørn Mæland (born 24 February 2001) is a Norwegian footballer currently playing as a defender for Odds BK.

Career statistics

Club

Notes

References

2001 births
Living people
Norwegian footballers
Norway youth international footballers
Association football defenders
Eliteserien players
Odds BK players
Sportspeople from Porsgrunn